The 1953 Western Kentucky Hilltoppers football team represented Western Kentucky State College (now known as Western Kentucky University) as a member of the Ohio Valley Conference (OVC) during the 1953 college football season. Led by sixth-year head coach Jack Clayton, the Hilltoppers compiled an overall record of 6–4 with a mark of 2–3 in conference play, placing fourth in the OVC. The team's captains were Marvin Satterly and Max Stevens.

Schedule

References

Western Kentucky
Western Kentucky Hilltoppers football seasons
Western Kentucky Hilltoppers football